Boggy Creek II: And the Legend Continues is a 1984 American monster horror film written, directed by and starring Charles B. Pierce. It is the sequel to 1972's The Legend of Boggy Creek. Prior to the release of this film, an unofficial sequel to The Legend of Boggy Creek was made in 1977 titled Return to Boggy Creek. The "Big Creature" in the film was portrayed by Hollywood stuntman and bodyguard James Faubus Griffith. Unlike the original film, which was met with positive reviews, Boggy Creek II was largely panned by critics.

Plot
Dr. Brian Lockhart is a professor of Anthropology at the University of Arkansas. He receives a call from a sheriff, who reports sighting a Bigfoot-like creature in a remote town in southwestern Arkansas.  Lockhart recruits the help of two of his students, Tim and Tanya, as well as Tanya's friend Leslie.

The group heads for an area near Boggy Creek, close to the town of Fouke, set up camp in the woods with a pop-up camper trailer and secure their perimeter with a SONAR system.  Lockhart sets about investigating the recent sighting, while relating to the group tales he had heard centered around the creature, presented in flashbacks.

The tales include:
 A local rancher who, while having lunch, mysteriously lost his herd of cattle and saw the creature leave the scene.
 A local-man who encountered the creature while repairing a flat tire on his vehicle. The man was rendered unconscious in the encounter and never came out of it in order to relate his story to others (how Lockhart then knows of it is unexplained).
 A local attorney who was in an outhouse that was attacked by the creature, soiling his pants in the encounter.
 The local sheriff who encountered the creature behind his home following a fishing trip. The creature and its young ran off with the sheriff's catch. This is the story Lockhart has come to investigate.

While talking with locals, Lockhart is met with resistance and disbelief by most. Of those willing to talk with him, he is directed to speak with "Old Man Crenshaw" who lives in a shack along the river bank. Lockhart leases a boat and takes off to meet with Crenshaw. Crenshaw is a sexagenarian man, fitting the stereotypical notion of a hillbilly or mountain man, living alone on his property. While somewhat welcoming to Lockhart and his entourage, he seems unwilling to talk too much about the creature, or why he is maintaining a series of bonfires on his land. A severe storm closes in and makes heading back down the river dangerous, forcing Lockhart and the students to have to stay the night in Crenshaw's cabin.

Believing Lockhart to be a medical doctor, Crenshaw enlists his help in tending to an animal he has caught. To Lockhart's amazement, it is the adolescent creature. Lockhart determines that the adult creature has been more hostile in the area recently due to the capture of its child, who is now near death. Lockhart commandeers Crenshaw's gun and ammo and returns the adolescent creature to the adult when it attacks the cabin in the night, knocking down the front door. With its young in its arms, the creature leaves the cabin without further incident.  The following morning, Crenshaw agrees with Lockhart's assessment that the creatures should be left alone. Lockhart decides not to tell others about his experiences while in the Boggy Creek area and returns down the river with his students.

Cast
 Charles B. Pierce - Dr. Brian C. Lockhart
 Cindy Butler - Leslie Ann Walker
 Chuck Pierce - Tim Thornton
 Jimmy Clem - Old Man Crenshaw
 Serene Hedin - Tanya Yazzie
 James Faubus Griffith - Big Creature

Mystery Science Theater 3000
The film was featured on the comedy series Mystery Science Theater 3000, as the sixth episode of season 10. Bill Corbett, performer and writer on the show, said: "It's the kind of movie that seems to hate you; to wish you active harm; to kick sand in your eyes and make you cry. And for me, this was personified by Mr. Charles B. Pierce, who is apparently responsible for every single aspect, every nano-second of this cruel and unusual bit of celluloid. He chose to write and play a grim, hostile, condescending, know-it-all of a man, a character who is proven superior to everyone else in the story again and again, who drills his lousy stinking voice-over narrative into our heads every freaking minute of this film, and who then has the temerity to wrap his movie up suggesting his sour Nazi of a character is really an ecological servant of God".

References

External links
 

1984 films
1984 horror films
American monster movies
American sequel films
Alternative sequel films
Bigfoot films
Films set in Arkansas
1980s English-language films
Films directed by Charles B. Pierce
1980s American films